Amblycorypha is a North American genus of round-headed katydids in the family Tettigoniidae. There are about 14 described species in Amblycorypha.

Species
These 14 species belong to the genus Amblycorypha:
 Amblycorypha alexanderi T. J. Walker, 2003 (clicker round-winged katydid)
 Amblycorypha arenicola Walker, T.J., 2004 (sandhill virtuoso katydid)
 Amblycorypha bartrami T. J. Walker, 2003 (Bartram's round-winged katydid)
 Amblycorypha cajuni Walker, T.J., 2004
 Amblycorypha carinata Rehn, J.A.G. & Hebard, 1914 (carinate katydid)
 Amblycorypha floridana Rehn, 1905 (Florida oblong-winged katydid)
 Amblycorypha huasteca (Saussure, 1859) (Texas oblong-winged katydid)
 Amblycorypha insolita Rehn & Hebard, 1914 (big bend oblong-winged katydid)
 Amblycorypha longinicta Walker, T.J., 2004 (common virtuoso katydid)
 Amblycorypha oblongifolia (De Geer, 1773) (oblong-winged katydid)
 Amblycorypha parvipennis Stål, 1876 (western round-winged katydid)
 Amblycorypha rivograndis Walker, T.J., 2004
 Amblycorypha rotundifolia (Scudder, 1863) (rattler round-winged katydid)
 Amblycorypha uhleri Stål, 1876 (Uhler's virtuoso katydid)

References

Further reading

External links

 

Phaneropterinae
Articles created by Qbugbot